Kate Rhodes (born 1964, in London) is a British poet and novelist.

In 1993 she completed a Ph.D. on the work of Tennessee Williams at the University of Essex, and has worked as an English teacher in a sixth form college and as a university lecturer. In 2004 she was granted a fellowship by the Hawthornden Literary Institute. Her debut collection Reversal was published in 2005 by Enitharmon Press. Reversal was the inaugural volume of the Enitharmon New Poets Series.

Publications

Alice Quentin

Crossbones Yard (2012, Mulholland Books)
A Killing of Angels (2013, Mulholland Books)
The Winter Foundlings (2014, Mulholland Books)
River of Souls (2015, Mulholland Books)
Blood Symmetry (2016, Mulholland Books)
Fatal Harmony (2018, independently published)

Ben Kitto

Hell Bay (2018, Simon & Schuster UK)
Ruin Beach (2018, Simon & Schuster UK)
Burnt Island (2019, Simon & Schuster UK)
Pulpit Rock (2020, Simon & Schuster UK)
Devil's Table (2021, Simon & Schuster UK)
The Brutal Tide (2022, Simon & Schuster UK)
Hangman Island (2023, Simon & Schuster UK)

External links
Enitharmon Press website
Independent on Sunday – Poem by Kate Rhodes – Bluebells website
Guardian Review – Saturday Poem by Kate Rhodes – Divining website
Writers associated with the university of Essex website
The story behind The Winter Foundlings - Online Essay by Kate Rhodes on Upcoming4.me

1964 births
Living people
21st-century English poets
English women poets
Alumni of the University of Essex
21st-century English women